Alexander Shaw (1737 – 30 May 1811) was a soldier and administrator who served as the third Lieutenant Governor of the Isle of Man.

Career
Shaw was commissioned into the 60th Regiment of Foot in 1756. He served in North America during the Seven Years' War as aide-de-camp to General Augustine Prévost and was severely wounded at the capture of Quebec in 1759. Shaw rose to the rank of colonel and returned to his home at Tordarroch House near Pitlochry at the end of the American Revolutionary War in 1783. From 1790 he acted as Lieutenant Governor and Deputy to the Governor of the Isle of Man: Shaw retired in 1804. He was the 15th Chief of Clan Shaw and 10th Chief of Clan Shaw of Tordarroch.

Family
He married firstly Charlotte Stewart; they had two sons. He married secondly Ann Elizabeth Blanckley; they had four sons and four daughters.

References

1737 births
1811 deaths
Lieutenant Governors of the Isle of Man
Royal American Regiment officers